Shutter is a 2014 Marathi language thriller film that was directed by V. K. Prakash and is a re-make of the Malayalam 2012 film of the same name. The film had its world premiere on 17 September 2014 and will have a theatrical release on 3 July 2015. It stars Sachin Khedekar as a man that has recently returned from overseas, only to go through a series of unexpected situations.

Filming for Shutter was completed in March 2014. Prakash chose to alter some portions of the story from the original film, stating "It’s an adaptation. I have concentrated on the content and not the ‘setting’ of the story." The trailer for the movie was launched on 24 June 2015.

Synopsis
Jitya Bhau (Sachin Khedekar) is a middle-class family man who has returned to his home in Maharashtra, as he is on a vacation from his overseas job. Due to a series of misadventures he ends up getting trapped with a nameless hooker (Sonalee Kulkarni) in a small shop room and must wait for one of his friends to release him. However the longer the two are trapped together the more the two end up learning about one another.

Cast
Prakash Bare as Struggling film director
Sachin Khedekar as Jitya Bhau
Sonalee Kulkarni as Hooker
Amey Wagh as Innocent auto rickshaw driver
Kaumudi Walokar as Daughter of Jitya Bhau
 Jaywant Wadkar
 Radhika Harshe 
 Kaumudi Walokar
 Kamlesh Sawant 
 Anirudh Hariip

References

External links
 

2014 films
Marathi remakes of Malayalam films
2010s Marathi-language films
Films directed by V. K. Prakash